Sonia Alfano (born 15 October 1971) is an Italian politician.

Alfano was an MEP from 2009 to 2014 for Italia dei Valori.

Since 18 April 2012 Alfano has been president of the Special Anti-Mafia Commission.

References

1971 births
MEPs for Italy 2009–2014
Politicians from Messina
21st-century women MEPs for Italy
Living people
University of Palermo alumni